Martín de Argüelles Jr. (1566–1630) was the first white child known to have been born in what is now the United States. His birthplace of St. Augustine, Florida (San Agustín, La Florida) is the oldest continuously occupied, European-founded city in the United States.

Birth
Argüelles was born in 1566 in the Spanish settlement of San Agustín, Spanish Florida. Martín's parents were Martín de Argüelles (Sr.) and Leonor Morales. His father, Martín Argüelles Sr., an Asturian hidalgo, was  one of the expeditioners who came to New Spain in the New World with Captain General Pedro Menéndez de Avilés in 1565. Argüelles Sr. was the first Alcalde (Mayor) of San Agustín, and had been in charge of munitions in the Florida forts of Santa María, San Agustín (now St. Augustine), and Santa Elena.

Lifetime
Martín Argüelles Jr. served the Spanish crown in Portugal and several garrisons and expeditions which embarked in the Spanish Armada which went in search of corsair Francis Drake. He was later transferred in 1594 from Havana, Cuba, to Mérida, Mexico, where he was appointed Executive Officer of the Mérida fortress and coast. Argüelles was married in Mérida.

Descendants
Argüelles' descendants included José Argüelles, who was one of the colonizers of the Province of New Santander in New Spain in 1749, in what is now the Mexican state of Tamaulipas.

See also
Hélène Desportes – often cited as the first white child born in Canada, New France.
Virginia Dare – first child of English parentage born in what is now US territory.

References
 Abbad y Lasierra, Iñigo, Relación del descubrimiento, conquista y población de las provincias y costas de la Florida - '
Relación de La Florida (1785); edición de Juan José Nieto Callén y José María Sánchez Molledo.
 Fairbanks, George R. (George Rainsford), History and antiquities of St. Augustine, Florida (1881), Jacksonville, Fla., H. Drew.
 Reynolds, Charles B. (Charles Bingham), Old Saint Augustine, a story of three centuries, (1893) St. Augustine, Fla. E. H. Reynolds.
 Menéndez de Avilés, Pedro. Cartas sobre la Florida, 1555-1574 / Pedro Menéndez de Avilés" "Letters regarding Florida, 1555-1574 by Pedro Menéndez de Avilés; Juan Carlos Mercado, edición, introducción y notas. Library of Congress.
 Lyon, Eugene, The enterprise of Florida : Pedro Menéndez de Avilés and the Spanish conquest of 1565-1568 (1976), Gainesville : University Presses of Florida.

1566 births
Year of death missing
History of Asturias
People of Spanish Florida
Spanish explorers
Spanish people of Greek descent